Vahedi is a surname. Notable people with the surname include:

Alireza Vahedi Nikbakht (born 1980), Iranian footballer and coach
Amir Vahedi (1961–2010), Iranian poker player
Mojtaba Vahedi (born 1964), Iranian politician and activist
Soheil Vahedi (born 1989), Iranian snooker player